Roberts Bluķis (4 April 1913 – 14 April 1998) was a Latvian ice hockey and basketball player. In ice hockey he played for Rīgas US, HK ASK Rīga, and Dinamo Riga during his career. Bluķis also played for the Latvian national team at the 1936 Winter Olympics and four World Championships. He studied at the Riga Technical University, earning a degree in engineering, and moved to Germany and then the United States after the Second World War.

References

External links
 

1913 births
1998 deaths
Basketball players from Riga
People from Kreis Riga
Latvian ice hockey forwards
Latvian men's basketball players
Olympic ice hockey players of Latvia
Ice hockey players at the 1936 Winter Olympics
Riga Technical University alumni
Latvian World War II refugees
Latvian emigrants to the United States